Live at the Village Vanguard Volume One is a live album by jazz drummer Elvin Jones recorded in 1984 at the Village Vanguard and released on the Landmark label.

Reception
The Allmusic review awarded the album 4 stars and stated "Not many drummer-led quintets feature two tenor saxophonists, but Elvin Jones, who has employed two tenors on several of his earlier recordings, clearly enjoys the stimulation that Frank Foster and Pat La Barbera provide one another on this live date at the Village Vanguard... Bassist Chip Jackson is solid throughout, and Jones' elastic approach to percussion keeps the music fresh throughout".

Track listing
 "It's Easy to Remember" (Lorenz Hart, Richard Rodgers) – 11:19 
 "Front Line" (Dave Samuels) – 11:15 
 "Tohryanse, Tohryanse" (Traditional) – 17:16 
 "George and Me" (Elvin Jones) – 6:30 
 "A Love Supreme" (John Coltrane) – 19:19

Personnel
Elvin Jones  – drums  
Frank Foster, Pat LaBarbera – tenor saxophone 
Fumio Karashima – piano
Chip Jackson – bass

References

Elvin Jones live albums
1984 live albums
Landmark Records albums
Albums recorded at the Village Vanguard